Selsdon Vale & Forestdale is a ward in the London Borough of Croydon. It was created from parts of Selsdon and Ballards and Heathfield wards. The first election is May 3, 2018.

History 
Councillor Badsha Quadir died on 12 September 2022 at the age of 64. A by-election is scheduled for Thursday 3 November 2022. Conservative candidate Fatima Zaman was elected on 3 November 2022 in a by-election.

List of Councillors

Mayoral election results 
Below are the results for the candidate which received the highest share of the popular vote in the ward at each mayoral election.

Ward Results

2022 by-election

2022 local election

2018 local election

External links
Croydon Ward Map

References 

Wards of the London Borough of Croydon